Project Flower was a joint Israeli-Iranian military effort to develop advanced missile systems. It was one of six oil-for-arms contracts that the countries signed in April 1977.

History
In the mid-1970s, Iran thought to expand its missile capability, including through cooperation with Israel with whom it had tacit military economic and intelligence cooperation at the time. In April 1977, six oil-for-arms contracts were signed, among them Project Flower. On 18 July 1977, Iranian Vice Minister of War General Hassan Toufanian traveled in secret to Israel where he met with Israeli Foreign Minister Moshe Dayan and Minister of Defense Ezer Weizmann. Iranian concerns over missile and nuclear developments in India and Pakistan were also discussed.

This project focused on the development of a longer range Gabriel anti-ship missile and a future submarine-launched variant, and intended to reproduce an American-designed missile with Israeli-made parts that could be fitted with nuclear warheads. The missile incorporated American navigation and guidance equipment.

The following year, Iran supplied Israel with $280 million worth of oil as a down payment. A team of Iranian experts began construction of a missile assembly facility near Sirjan, in south central Iran, and a missile test range near Rafsanjan

In February 1979, the monarchy of Mohammed Reza Pahlavi was overthrown in the Iranian Revolution, and Project Flower ended. The Israeli engineers and defense officials returned to Israel and all the blueprints and diagrams of the weapons systems were sent back via diplomatic courier.

Fraud
According to a very senior source in the Israeli Ministry of Defence, the weapons deal with Iran were fraudulent. With each of the six joint projects, the Israelis planned to deceive the Iranians by providing them only an outdated version of the weapon in question, while using Iranian money to build a new generation for Israel's exclusive use.

Yaakov Shapiro, the Defense Ministry official in charge of coordinating the negotiations with Iran from 1975 to 1978, recalls: "In Iran they treated us like kings. We did business with them on a stunning scale. Without the ties with Iran, we would not have had the money to develop weaponry that is today in the front line of the defense of the State of Israel."

See also
 Iranian military industry
 Iran–Israel relations
 Iran's missile forces
 Israel Defense Forces

References

External links
 Joseph S. Bermudez, Jr., "Iran's Missile Development," The International Missile Bazaar: the New Supplier's Network (San Francisco: Westview Press, 1994), William C. Potter and Harlan W. Jencks, eds., p. 48.
 "Minutes from Meeting Held in Tel Aviv between H. E. General M. Dayan, Foreign Minister of Israel, and H.E. General H. Toufanian, Vice Minister of War, Imperial Government of Iran," Top Secret Minutes from Israel's Ministry of Foreign Affairs, 18 July 1977, in Digital National Security Archive
 Ronen Bergman, "5 billion Reasons to Talk to Iran," Haaretz, 19 March 1999

Iran–Israel relations
1977 in Iran
1977 in Israel
Abandoned military projects
Abandoned military projects of Israel